HMS Swallow was an  destroyer, which served with the Royal Navy. The S class were a cheaper and faster alternative to the larger  most recently procured by the service. Launched on 1 August 1918, Swallow took part in one of the final acts of the Harwich Force on 1 October as part of a flotilla that unsuccessfully tried to intercept the retreating German troops. After the armistice, Swallow was transferred to the Mediterranean fleet and served in the Black Sea covering the evacuation of demobilised forces from Batumi and Marmara Ereğlisi. Returning to the United Kingdom in 1923, the vessel was placed in reserve until 1936. On 24 September in that year, after just under eighteen years in service, Swallow was one of the destroyers exchanged for RMS Majestic and subsequently broken up at Inverkeithing.

Design

Swallow was one of twenty-four Admiralty  destroyers ordered by the British Admiralty on 9 April 1917 as part of the Eleventh War Construction Programme. Differences with the R class were minor, such as having the searchlight moved aft.

Two funnels were fitted.

Armament consisted of three QF  Mk IV guns on the ship's centreline.  One was mounted raised on the forecastle, one between the funnels on a platform and one aft. The ship also mounted a single 2-pounder (40 mm) pom-pom anti-aircraft gun for air defence. Four  torpedo tubes were fitted in two twin rotating mounts aft. The ship was designed to mount two  tubes either side of the superstructure but this addition required the forecastle plating to be cut away, making the vessel very wet so they were removed. The weight saved enabled the heavier Mark V 21-inch torpedo to be carried.  The ship's complement was 90 officers and ratings.

Construction and career
Laid down in September 1917 by Scotts in Greenock with the yard number 491, Swallow was launched on 9 November 1918. The vessel was the thirty-seventh of the name. Completed on 27 September 1918, the ship joined the Tenth Destroyer Flotilla of the Harwich Force. Shortly after entering service, on 1 October, the ship took part in a flotilla led by the destroyer leader  that sailed to intercept retreating German forces, but did not find any. This was one of the final voyages undertaken by the Harwich Force during the war.

After the armistice, Swallow was recommissioned on 17 February 1919 into the Sixth Destroyer Flotilla as part of the new Mediterranean fleet. The ship then transversed the Bosporus into the Black Sea to Batumi, staying until 9 July to cover the evacuation of troops to Russia. From there, the destroyer sailed to Bandırma in what is now Turkey on 19 July along with the dreadnought battleship . The two ships then continued to Marmara Ereğlisi to supervise the movement of the demobilised troops. At the conclusion of this service, on 4 December 1923, the destroyer was transferred to Chatham and, on 29 January 1926 placed in the Reserve Fleet.

On 22 April 1930, the London Naval Treaty was signed, which limited total destroyer tonnage in the Navy. The navy was looking to introduce more modern destroyers and so needed to retire some of the older vessels. Swallow remained in service until 24 September 1936 when the ship was given to Thos. W. Ward of Sheffield as one of a number given in exchange for the liner Majestic. The destroyer was subsequently broken up at Inverkeithing.

Pennant numbers

References

Citations

Bibliography

 
 
 
 
 
 
 

 
 

1918 ships
S-class destroyers (1917) of the Royal Navy
Ships built on the River Clyde
World War I destroyers of the United Kingdom